Anthony Davis (born 16 November 1974, London) is a broadcaster, journalist and entertainer. He first appeared in BBC sitcoms and drama such as Grange Hill and Tricky Business in the 1980s as a child performer, earning him a place in the Radio Times Guide to TV Comedy.

Since childhood Davis' talents encompassed music, magic, impersonation and comedy. As variety fell out of favour in the mid-1990s, he emerged as a host, compére and quizmaster, presenting Stake Out on Challenge TV and making headlines as the voice of the 2002 Commonwealth Games opening and closing ceremonies. As a BBC events announcer and commentator he voiced the Royal Variety Performance (2004 and 2006), 2004 TV Moments, Eurovision: Making Your Mind Up (2005 and 2007), and Comic Relief Night. Davis portrayed Hal in the 2001 television series pilot programme Kiss of Life. He also contributed voice work to Channel 4's comedy series Modern Toss, and various commercial advertising campaigns. He was also a regular presenter on Visit London's satellite channel London TV.

As a radio presenter and DJ, he first appeared on Radio Jackie, before securing a daily national show Anthony Davis For Breakfast heard every morning on Capital Life (DAB) in the United Kingdom until September 2006. He first appeared on London speech station LBC 97.3 in May 2005 as paper reviewer and then in 2006 covering various phone-in slots. Since June 2006 has been a regular presenter initially on the Saturday to Monday morning programme from 1 am to 5 am before moving to the same time slot from Monday to Friday in October 2009. He has also stood in for other presenters Clive Bull, Steve Allen and Nick Abbot. Until March 2008 he was a jazz music host in the mid morning slot on national DAB station theJazz. In 2007–08 he was heard announcing The Alan Titchmarsh Show on ITV1. From October 2008, after the demise of theJazz, he joined the line-up of the relaunched Jazz FM as mid-morning presenter. His commercial television work included voicing campaigns for Twix, Gaviscon, Cillit Bang, Calgon and currently Admiral car insurance.

After five years of night shifts, Anthony Davis resigned from his LBC 97.3 overnight programme for health reasons, presenting his last show on Friday 28 January 2011 (having achieved the largest radio audience share in UK ratings history). He continued to DJ for Jazz FM on his mid-morning show, Monday to Friday. On 20 June 2011 it was announced that Davis was returning to LBC 97.3 to succeed Clive Bull on the LBC Late Show, Sunday to Thursday at 10.00 pm. In August 2011 Davis stepped down from his mid-morning programme on Jazz FM to concentrate on the LBC 97.3 Late Show. Programme Controller Mike Vitti told RadioToday.co.uk: "Anthony Davis has been an amazing servant to Jazz FM. His dedication to the station is unquestionable and through his talent, his contribution is undeniable. Jazz FM would be a much poorer place without him so I’m happy to say he’ll be taking over duties as the male station voice".

In December 2013, Davis stepped down as late-night presenter on LBC 97.3 after 8 years at the station. Just 24 hours after stepping down at LBC 97.3, it was announced he was heading to Smooth Radio to present the national drivetime show from January 2014.

He hosted Drivetime on the Smooth FM network to a national audience of 6 million listeners until January 2017 when he relocated to Los Angeles.

Since July 2019, Anthony created and hosts the daily morning show Five Minute News covering politics, inequality, health and climate – delivering unbiased, verified and truthful world news – for which he won a 2021 Communicator Award from The Academy of Interactive & Visual Arts in New York.

He continues to provide transcontinental political commentary for the BBC and LBC radio.

In August 2020 Anthony's voice was selected as the announcer in the Emmy nominated Nike 'You Can't Stop Us' commercial and viral video campaign, racking up over 50 million views on YouTube in just three days and winning the coveted Film Grand Prix in Cannes for 2021.

References

External links 
 

Living people
1974 births
English male child actors
English radio personalities
English male television actors
English television presenters
Smooth Network presenters